Shenzhen Metro Line 2 (formerly branded as Shekou line), runs West–East from  to . It opened on 28 December 2010. Line 2 merges into Line 8 at Liantang station, with trains on Line 2 continue service to Yantian Road station.

History

First stage
This section opened on 28 December 2010.

Second stage
The second stage of Line 2 opened on 28 June 2011.

Third stage
The third stage of Line 2 opened on 28 October 2020.

Timeline

Service routes
  — 
  —  (Working days peak hours only)

Stations

Rolling Stock

Notes

References

Shenzhen Metro lines
Railway lines opened in 2010